"Suzanne Is Getting Married" is a song by punk rock band Screeching Weasel. It was released as a single in 1994 through Lookout! Records. The title track was written and released to commemorate the wedding of Maximumrocknroll's Suzanne Bartchy and AK Press's Ramsey Kanaan.

Both songs on the release were recorded during the sessions for the band's sixth studio album, How to Make Enemies and Irritate People. Mike Dirnt from Green Day performed on the album and played bass on "Suzanne Is Getting Married". Due to a scheduled performance on the Late Show with David Letterman, he was unable to perform on the B-side, "Waiting for Susie", so producer (and future full-time bassist) Mass Giorgini played bass on the song. "Waiting for Susie" was co-written with longtime bassist Dan Vapid; he left the band before these recording sessions began. The song was written for the group's fourth studio album Wiggle (1993) but was not recorded for it, and was later recorded for this release. The single is currently out of print, but both songs are included on the two-disc rarities compilation Thank You Very Little (2000).

Track listing

Personnel
 Ben Weasel - lead vocals, guitar
 Jughead - guitar
 Mike Dirnt - bass on track 1, backing vocals
 Mass Giorgini - bass on track 2
 Dan Panic - drums
 Gretchen Smear - backing vocals

1994 singles
1994 songs
Screeching Weasel songs